Do Ab (also Romanized as Do Āb; also known as Do Āb-e Kūr Shūrāb) is a village in Veysian Rural District, Veysian District, Dowreh County, Lorestan Province, Iran. At the 2006 census, its population was 260, in 63 families.

References 

Towns and villages in Dowreh County